Delano is a ghost town located in northeastern Elko County, Nevada, about 36 miles north of Montello.  Delano was the center of a small gold-mining district that saw production from the 1870s to the 1960s.  The post office closed in 1927. The community has the name of a local trapper.

The remaining buildings at Delano were destroyed by a wildfire in the 1990s, and only archaeological remains survive at the site today.

Geography

References

Ghost towns in Elko County, Nevada
Ghost towns in Nevada